Mark Randall may refer to:

 Mark Randall (basketball) (born 1967), American basketball player
 Mark Randall (footballer) (born 1989), English football player

See also 
 Mark Rendall (born 1988), Canadian actor